Eduard Franz Schmidt (October 31, 1902 – February 10, 1983) was an American actor of theatre, film and television.  Franz portrayed King Ahab in the 1953 biblical low-budget film Sins of Jezebel, Jethro in Cecil B. DeMille's The Ten Commandments (1956), and Jehoam in Henry Koster's The Story of Ruth (1960).

Life and career
Franz was born in Milwaukee, Wisconsin. His childhood ambition was to become a commercial artist, a goal that led him to enroll later at the University of Wisconsin, where he joined the Wisconsin Players Theater, a new student group. Performing in the theater's 1922-1923 season reignited his ambition to become an artist, although one of a different type, an actor.  A year later, he was cast in Chicago productions of the Coffee-Miller Players.  Dropping his surname, Franz next acted with the Provincetown Players in New York's Greenwich Village, a hothouse of theatrical ferment that had first brought the world the dramatic works of writers Eugene O'Neill, Susan Glaspell, and Edna St. Vincent Millay. Franz also appeared with Paul Robeson in The Emperor Jones and with Walter Huston in Desire Under the Elms. He continued to perform until his stage work was interrupted by the Great Depression.

By then married to his wife Margaret, he tried to eke out a living as chicken farmers in Texas.  The young couple soon returned to Wisconsin, where Franz acted in regional theater while teaching art to pay the bills.  By 1936, he was a player on the national stage, performing from coast to coast. He became a leading Broadway actor for nearly 30 years, in such plays as First Stop to Heaven, Home of the Brave, Embezzled Heaven, and Conversation at Midnight.  He made his film debut in a bit part, in 1947, in Killer at Large, but followed that brief appearance the next year with a memorable role in the motion picture The Scar (also titled Hollow Triumph).  His fourth movie saw him acting with  John Wayne in Wake of the Red Witch, in 1948. He portrayed Chief Broken Hand in White Feather.  He played such intellectuals as Dr. Stern in The Thing from Another World (1951), a university professor in The Four Skulls of Jonathan Drake (1959), and Justice Louis Brandeis in The Magnificent Yankee (1950), a role he reprised  in the 1965 television adaptation. He appeared in a 1957 television adaptation of A. J. Cronin's novel Beyond This Place, which was directed by Sidney Lumet.

Franz performed as well in two separate remakes of Al Jolson's 1927 cinema classic The Jazz Singer, each time playing the key role of the aged and ailing synagogue cantor upset by his son's decision to pursue a secular show-business career rather than continue the family tradition and follow in his father's religious footsteps.  Those remakes were the 1952 film version of the story starring Danny Thomas and the 1959 television version starring Jerry Lewis.

In 1956, Franz appeared on a first-season episode of Gunsmoke titled "Indian Scout", performing in the role of Amos Cartwight, a scout for the United States cavalry who knowingly leads the troopers into an ambush by a Comanche war party. That same year he guest-starred with Joan Fontaine in the episode "The De Santre Story" of the NBC anthology series The Joseph Cotten Show.  Later, In 1958, Franz was cast in the second season of Zorro, playing the role of Señor Gregorio Verdugo. He guest-starred as Jules Silberg in the 1960 episode "The Test" of CBS's anthology series The DuPont Show with June Allyson.

In 1961, Franz starred in the episode "The Duke of Texas" of western series Have Gun - Will Travel.  Also, in that same year, Franz guest-starred as Gustave Helmer in the ABC legal drama The Law and Mr. Jones with James Whitmore in the title role and Jack Mullaney as a second guest star. About that same time, he portrayed characters on NBC's anthology series The Barbara Stanwyck Show and on the NBC western Cimarron City.  Always dedicated to the theater, despite his television work, Franz in 1961 performed in the world premiere in Los Angeles of Edna St. Vincent Millay's poetic drama Conversation at Midnight, co-starring with James Coburn and Jack Albertson. 
In 1962 acted in Beauty and the Beast. Two years later, Franz was cast as psychiatric clinic director Dr. Edward Raymer in 30 episodes of the weekly ABC medical drama Breaking Point with co-star Paul Richards.  Then, in 1964, he reprised his role in Conversation at Midnight at Broadway's Billy Rose Theatre.  Both that stage version of Millay's work and the one done in 1961 were produced by Worley Thorne in association with Susan Davis.

Filmography
Source:

References

External links

1902 births
1983 deaths
Male actors from Milwaukee
American people of German descent
American male film actors
American male stage actors
American male television actors
Male actors from Los Angeles
20th-century American male actors